Hamaar Sautan Hamaar Saheli (English: My Husband's Other Wife and My Friend) is an Indian television soap opera which premiered on Mahuaa TV on 28 November 2011.

Plot summary
Hamaar Sautan Hamaar Saheli follows the journey of two women in rural North India. Chanda is a lively tribal girl who is forcefully married off by her alcoholic father to the elder, womanizing Thakur Nirbhay Singh. After marriage, Chanda discovers that Nirbhay is already married to the docile and submissive Asha. This is a story of how the two women unite to fight against the man who has deceived them both.

Cast

Main cast

 Dolphin Dubey as Chanda
 Geetika Shyam as Asha
 Amit Shukla as Nirbhay Singh
 Nishant Mahim as Madhav
 Meera Gupta as Lakhpati
 Nirmal Chaudhary as Ramkhilawan

References

External links

Indian television soap operas
2011 Indian television series debuts
Bhojpuri-language television shows